AIDS: Don't Die of Ignorance was a public health campaign begun in 1986 by the UK Government in response to the rise of HIV/AIDS in the United Kingdom.

The government believed that millions of people could become infected and a leaflet was sent to every home in the UK.

Norman Fowler, then Secretary of State for Health and Social Services, felt that Prime Minister Margaret Thatcher "wasn't a natural supporter" of the campaign as she felt that informing people of HIV and unprotected sex would make people more likely to engage in such practices; a view that Fowler thought was "eccentric".
The advertising campaign was made by the agency TBWA. The company had run previous campaigns for the government to raise awareness of blood donations and rubella epidemics. TBWA's designer Malcolm Gaskin was interviewed for The Guardian in 2017 about the campaign. Gaskin recalled that when TBWA was approached by the government "The big problem was that nobody knew anything about it. It was like an alien plague. Where did it come from? How big would it get? Panic and speculation was spreading". The disease itself would be targeted in the advert as opposed to individuals who had the disease.

Fowler claimed that "90% of the public recognised the advert and a vast number changed their behaviour because of it" and as it was a "life and death situation...There was no time to think about whether it might offend one or two people" as hospital wards were "full of young men dying".   Contemporary typography was used to inform the public that this was a current and new disease. The phrase was conceived of by copywriter  David O’Connor-Thompson. Individual targeted messages from the campaign were created for dentists and tattooists who were at specific risk.
The Royal Mail also marked mail with the slogan.
The campaign had a lasting effect on the rate of sexual transmitted diseases in the UK.

Tombstone/Iceberg advert
The campaign is most remembered for a distinctive  television advertising campaign, voiced by John Hurt and directed by Nicolas Roeg. A volcano features in the most notable advertisement and an iceberg in the second. Malcolm Gaskin said that "Scaring people was deliberate" to guarantee that the viewers would read the leaflets posted to their house as the duration of the advert was only 40 seconds. Roeg was chosen for his signature “doom and gloom sci-fi aesthetic”. The volcano in the advert reinforces the apocalyptic tone. It was originally intended that a Civil defense siren would sound at the start of the advert, but this was rejected by Thatcher as being overdramatic. Gaskin said of Thatcher's decision that “…she was probably right. If we’d kept it like that I think everyone would have headed for the beaches”.

See also
 Catch it, Bin it, Kill it
 Lonely Water

References

External links
 National Archives - The AIDS monolith advertisement

1986 in the United Kingdom
HIV/AIDS in the United Kingdom
Infomercials
British television commercials
1980s television commercials
HIV/AIDS in television
Public information films